Miriam Leah Gamliel (born Lani Droz; 1976 in Pittsburgh, Pennsylvania) is an American Orthodox Jewish actress, singer, and activist. A baalat teshuva with a background in musical theatre, she is the founder of the Arts and Torah Association for Religious Artists (ATARA), an organization promoting Orthodox women in the arts. In 2012, she was named one of The Jewish Week's "36 Under 36", a list of influential Jewish figures under age 36.

Early life
Gamliel was born in Pittsburgh, Pennsylvania, to a Conservative Jewish family. She studied at a local music conservatory before switching to Barnard College. She also studied musical theater at Pennsylvania State University.

While pursuing a Bachelor of Fine Arts in musical theater, she took a year-long trip to Israel to study abroad at She'arim College of Jewish Studies for Women in Har Nof, which motivated her to become religious. Told that theater was incompatible with an Orthodox lifestyle, she abandoned the field for several years.

Upon returning to the United States, she completed her bachelor's degree from Barnard College in 1999 and earned a master's degree in library sciences. She then attended Touro College's Graduate School of Jewish Studies, where she worked as a librarian and was involved in the Association of Jewish Libraries, graduating with a second master's in Jewish history.

Arts and Torah Association for Religious Artists (ATARA)
Gamliel co-founded the Arts and Torah Association for Religious Artists (ATARA) in late 2006 while she was a student at Touro. ATARA provides arts education, performance opportunities, and other resources to Orthodox female artists looking to express themselves within the boundaries of halacha. Gamliel was inspired to develop ATARA after being commissioned to direct an all-female version of A... My Name Is Alice for Congregation Ohab Zedek in Manhattan.

The organization is best known for its annual three-day Arts & Torah Conference, which features performances and workshops in music, theatre, poetry, dance, and film. Presenters have included Rachel Factor, Shaindel Antelis, and former New York City Ballet dancer Dena Abergel, while conference events have been held at Merkin Concert Hall, Kaufman Center, and Stern College for Women.

Personal life
A former resident of Brooklyn, Gamliel currently lives in Montreal with her husband, Michael Gamliel, and children. As an adult, she has studied at the Drisha Institute and Yeshiva University's Azrieli Graduate School of Jewish Education and Administration. She is the program director of the Broadway Kids program at Shulamith School for Girls.

Credits

As actress

As director

Other credits
 Mister Rogers' Neighborhood (1998) (Season 28, Episode 14: "Little and Big") (location producer)

References

External links
 ATARA official website
 

Living people
1976 births
Orthodox Jewish women musicians
21st-century American actresses
American directors
American Orthodox Jews
Touro College alumni
American emigrants to Canada
Actresses from Pittsburgh
Barnard College alumni
Jewish singers
Jewish American actresses
21st-century women musicians
21st-century American Jews